Jermaine Fazande (born January 14, 1975) is a former American football running back of the National Football League (NFL). He was originally drafted by the San Diego Chargers in the second round of the 1999 NFL Draft. He played college football at Oklahoma.

Fazande is currently a police officer with the Rice University Police Department in Houston, Texas.

College career
Fazande attended the University of Oklahoma from 1994 to 1998 as a fullback. As a redshirt freshman in 1994, Fazande did not see the field until 1995. He rushed for a career high 491 yards on 105 attempts and five touchdowns as a Junior in 1997. Injuries, including a fractured jaw suffered during a practice in August 1998, limited Fazande to just nine games his senior season, as he rushed 42 times for just 161 yards.

College statistics

Professional career

San Diego Chargers
Fazande was drafted by the San Diego Chargers with the 60th overall pick in the 2nd round of the 1999 NFL draft. The Chargers had acquired the draft pick in a trade with the Atlanta Falcons in May 1998 for wide receiver Tony Martin. A fullback in college, the Chargers moved him to running back, hoping to copy some success they had with Natrone Means. A backup as a rookie, he had his first big game in the final game of the season against the Denver Broncos, carrying the ball 30 times and rushing for 183 yards and the only touchdown of the game, as San Diego won 12–6. He finished his rookie campaign by leading the Chargers in rushing, carrying the ball 91 times for 365 yards and two touchdowns. Following the season, the Chargers released veteran Natrone Means, allowing for Fazande to work for a larger role the following season. In 2000, Fazande was second on the Chargers in rushing with 368 yards on 119 carries, rushing for just two touchdowns. In 2001, the Chargers with new general manager John Butler drafted hall of famer LaDainian Tomlinson, allowing the team to release Fazande at final cuts on September 3, 2001.

New England Patriots
On May 1, 2003, the New England Patriots signed Fazande. Fazande, however, never made it out of training camp with the Patriots, and never played again in the NFL.

Professional statistics

Personal life
Following his NFL career, Fazande became a police officer with the Rice University Police Department in Houston, Texas.

References

1975 births
Living people
People from Marrero, Louisiana
Players of American football from Louisiana
American football running backs
Oklahoma Sooners football players
San Diego Chargers players